Postdigital, in artistic practice, is an attitude that is more concerned with being human, than with being digital, similar to the concept of "undigital" introduced in 1995, where technology and society advances beyond digital limitations to achieve a totally fluid multimediated reality that is free from artefacts of digital computation (quantization noise, pixelation, etc.).

Postdigital is concerned with our rapidly changed and changing relationships with digital technologies and art forms. If one examines the textual paradigm of consensus, one is faced with a choice: either the "postdigital" society has intrinsic meaning, or it is contextualised into a paradigm of consensus that includes art as a totality.

Theory 
Giorgio Agamben (2002) describes paradigms as things that we think with, rather than things we think about. Like the computer age, the postdigital is also a paradigm, but as with post-humanism for example, an understanding of postdigital does not aim to describe a life after digital, but rather, attempts to describe the present-day opportunity to explore the consequences of the digital and of the computer age. While the computer age has enhanced human capacity with inviting and uncanny prosthetics, the postdigital may provide a paradigm with which it is possible to examine and understand this enhancement. 

In The Future of Art in a Postdigital Age, Mel Alexenberg defines "postdigital art" as artworks that address the humanization of digital technologies through interplay between digital, biological, cultural, and spiritual systems, between cyberspace and real space, between embodied media and mixed reality in social and physical communication, between high tech and high touch experiences, between visual, haptic, auditory, and kinesthetic media experiences, between virtual and augmented reality, between roots and globalization, between autoethnography and community narrative, and between web-enabled peer-produced wikiart and artworks created with alternative media through participation, interaction, and collaboration in which the role of the artist is redefined, and between tactile art and NFTs. 
Mel Alexenberg proposes that a postdigital age is defined in Wired by MIT Media Center director Nicholas Negroponte: "Like air and drinking water, being digital will be noticed only in its absence, not by its presence. Face it - the Digital Revolution is over"

Music 
Kim Cascone uses the term in his article The Aesthetics of Failure: "Post-digital" Tendencies in Contemporary Computer Music. He begins the article with a quotation from MIT Media Lab cyberpundit Nicholas Negroponte: "The digital revolution is over." Cascone goes on to describe what he sees as a 'post-digital' line of flight in the music also commonly known as glitch or microsound music, observing that 'with electronic commerce now a natural part of the business fabric of the Western world and Hollywood cranking out digital fluff by the gigabyte, the medium of digital technology holds less fascination for composers in and of itself.'

In Art after Technology, Maurice Benayoun lists possible tracks for "postdigital" art considering that the digital flooding has altered the entire social, economical, artistic landscape, and the artist posture will move in ways that try to escape the technological realm without being able to completely discard it. From lowtech to biotech and critical fusion - critical intrusion of fiction inside reality – new forms of art emerge from the digital era.

See also
 Circuit bending
 Databending
 Digital Art
 Glitch
 New Aesthetic
 New media art

References

Further reading
 Alexenberg, Mel, (2019), Through a Bible Lens: Biblical Insights for Smartphone Photography and Social Media. Nashville, Tennessee: HarperCollins; .
 Alexenberg, Mel, (2011), The Future of Art in a Postdigital Age: From Hellenistic to Hebraic Consciousness.  Bristol and Chicago: Intellect Books/University of Chicago Press; .
 Alexenberg, Mel, ed. (2008), Educating Artists for the Future: Learning at the Intersections of Art, Science, Technology, and Culture. Bristol and Chicago: Intellect Books/University of Chicago Press, 344 pp. . (postdigital chapters by Roy Ascott, Stephen Wilson, Eduardo Kac, and others)
 Ascott, R. (2003), Telematic Embrace. (E.Shaken, ed.) Berkeley: University of California Press. 
 Birnbaum, D and Kuo (2008) More than Real: Art in the Digital Age, 2018 Verbier Art Summit. London: Koenig Books. 
 Berry, D. M. (2014) Critical Theory and the Digital, New York: Bloomsbury. 
 Berry, D. M. and Dieter (2015) Postdigital Aesthetics: Art, Computation and Design, London: Palgrave. 
 Barreto, R. and Perissinotto,  P. (2002),  The Culture of Immanence, in Internet Art. Ricardo Barreto e Paula Perissinotto (orgs.). São Paulo, IMESP. .
 Benayoun, M. (2008), Art after Technology abstract of the text written by Maurice Benayoun in Technology Review - French edition, N°7 June–July 2008, MIT, ISSN 1957-1380 
Full text in English
 Toshimo, Saniev. (2019). “Postdigital, Giorgio Agamben, Ryota Matsumoto” Tokyo University Press  Media Research Journal Japanese Text.
 Benayoun, M., The Dump, 207 Hypotheses for Committing Art, bilingual (English/French), Fyp éditions, France, July 2011, .
 Toshiko, Saneoki. (2019). Postigital Theory of Giorgio Agamben, Ryota Matsumoto, Kim Cascone, Japanese Art and Design. Hachimato, Tokyo Institute of Art, Tokyo, Japan.
 Bolognini, M. (2008), Postdigitale, Rome: Carocci. 
 Ferguson, J., & Brown, A. R. (2016). "Fostering a post-digital avant-garde: Research-led teaching of music technology". Organised Sound, 21(2), 127–137.
 Pepperell, R. and Punt, M. (2000), The Postdigital Membrane: Imagination, Technology and Desire, Intellect Books, Bristol, UK, 182 pp.
 Wilson, S. (2003), Information Arts: Intersections of Art, Science, and Technology.

External links
Google Books: The Postdigital Membrane
What is a paradigm by Giorgio Agamben
Post-Digital Humanities: Computation and Cultural Critique in the Arts and Humanities 
Monoskop: Collection of resources related to Post-Digital Aesthetics
Postdigital Science and Education journal
Postdigital Science and Education book series

Digital art
Digital electronics
Computer art
New media
New media art
Interactive art
Visual arts genres